The Greenwich 24 is an American trailerable sailboat that was designed by George H. Stadel Jr. as a cruiser-racer and daysailer. It was first built in 1968.

The Greenwich 24 design was developed into the Cape Dory 25 in 1973, using the same hull, but a new deck and coach house. While the Greenwich 25 was not sold in large numbers, the derivative Cape Dory 25 sold 845 boats over its nine year production run.

Production
The design was built by Allied Boat Co. Inc. in the United States, but it is now out of production. It was the smallest boat in the Allied product line and was not as commercially successful as its larger boats.

Design
The Greenwich 24 is a recreational keelboat, built predominantly of fiberglass, with wooden trim. It has a masthead sloop rig; a spooned raked stem; a raised counter, angled transom; a keel-mounted rudder controlled by a tiller and a fixed long keel. It displaces  and carries  of lead ballast.

The boat is normally fitted with a small, well-mounted  outboard motor for docking and maneuvering. The open outboard well has been noted as troublesome, as, under some sailing conditions, it can scoop up water, if not sealed by a hatch.

The design has sleeping accommodation for four people, with a double "V"-berth in the bow cabin and two straight settees in the main cabin. The galley is located beside the companionway ladder and has only a single sink, with no stove provisions. The head is located under the forward cabin "V"-berth.

Ventilation is provided by a large forward deck hatch, the main hatch and the aft outboard well hatch, which has an integral vent.

The design has a PHRF racing average handicap of 273.

Operational history
In a 2010 review Steve Henkel wrote, "although her marketers intimated it, the boat is not all things to all sailors. Her draft is too shallow to let her be close winded, disqualifying her from being a satisfactory "racer". Her galley space is inadequate for more than a casual overnight (Where, for example, is space for a two-burner stove?) With her narrow stern and longish counter overhang, any significant weight in the cockpit would make her stern-heavy to the point that the scuppers might let water in rather than drain out, and the open motorwell could scoop water underway, slowing the boat and gradually filling the motorwell. As one owner observed, 'It did get rather exciting when the gas cans floated up and turned over as the well filled.' (If the motor were removed, a flush plug could be inserted.)"

See also
List of sailing boat types

References

External links
Photo of a Greenwich 24 at anchor

Keelboats
1960s sailboat type designs
Sailing yachts
Trailer sailers
Sailboat type designs by George H. Stadel Jr.
Sailboat types built by Allied Boat Company